Joanna Smolarek (born 26 November 1965 in Katowice, Śląskie) is a former female track and field sprinter from Poland, who represented her native country at the 1988 Summer Olympics in Seoul, South Korea. She set her personal best (11.35) in the women's 100 metres event in 1988.

References
 sports-reference

1965 births
Living people
Polish female sprinters
Athletes (track and field) at the 1988 Summer Olympics
Olympic athletes of Poland
Sportspeople from Katowice
Olympic female sprinters